Yue Ruiqing (born 2 January 1962) is a Chinese structural engineer who is dean of Urbanization and Urban Safety School, Beijing University of Technology, and an academician of the Chinese Academy of Engineering. He was chairman of MCC Construction Research Institute Co., Ltd. and China Steel Construction Society.

Biography
Yue was born in Qiqihar, Heilongjiang, on 2 January 1962. He attended Tsinghua University where he received his Bachelor of Engineering degree in 1985. After completing his Master of Engineering degree at General Institute of Architecture, Ministry of Metallurgical Industry, in 1988, he attended China Europe International Business School where he obtained his EMBA in 2011.

He was chairman of MCC Construction Research Institute Co., Ltd. and president of China Steel Construction Society.
On 26 November 2020, he was engaged by Beijing University of Technology as founding dean of Urbanization and Urban Safety School.

Honours and awards
 27 November 2017 Member of the Chinese Academy of Engineering (CAE)

References

1962 births
Living people
People from Qiqihar
Engineers from Heilongjiang
Tsinghua University alumni
Members of the Chinese Academy of Engineering